Danny Adam Richar (born June 9, 1983) is a Dominican professional baseball player who is currently a free agent. In a three-season Major League Baseball career as a second baseman for the Chicago White Sox and Cincinnati Reds, Richar had a .229 batting average, six home runs, and 18 runs batted in.

Career
Richar originally signed as an undrafted free agent with the Arizona Diamondbacks on July 9, 2001. He played for the Single-A Lancaster JetHawks from 2003 (first professional season) to 2005 including 26 games for the Double-A El Paso Diablos in 2004. He had his most home runs as a minor leaguer with 20 in 2005.

On June 16, 2007, he was traded to the Chicago White Sox for outfield prospect Aaron Cunningham. He hit .346 with 5 home runs in 32 games for the White Sox Triple-A team, the Charlotte Knights, before being recalled by the big league club on July 28, 2007, after second baseman Tadahito Iguchi was traded to the Philadelphia Phillies.

On September 16, 2007 when the Chicago White Sox were playing the Los Angeles Angels, Richar hit a game-tying two-run homer in the eighth inning. His home run made it possible for up Hall of Famer (inducted in 2018) Jim Thome to his 500th career home run.

On July 31, 2008, Richar along with pitcher Nick Masset were traded for outfielder Ken Griffey Jr. of the Cincinnati Reds.

On November 4, 2009, Richar filed for free agency. He signed a minor league contract with the Florida Marlins on December 21, and spent the 2010 season with their triple-A affiliate, the New Orleans Zephyrs, where he batted .315 in 128 games. He played in 2011 for the Camden Riversharks organization of the Atlantic League of Professional Baseball.

Richar signed with the Kansas City T-Bones of the American Association of Independent Professional Baseball and played for them during the 2014 season.

On May 2, 2016, Richar was traded to the Toros de Tijuana of the Mexican Baseball League. He became a free agent after the 2016 season.

On March 21, 2017, Richar signed with the New Jersey Jackals of the Can-Am League. He was released on May 6, 2017.

On February 13, 2018, Richar signed with the Road Warriors of the Atlantic League of Professional Baseball. He was released on May 1, 2018.

References

External links

1983 births
Living people
Azucareros del Este players
Bridgeport Bluefish players
Camden Riversharks players
Charlotte Knights players
Chicago White Sox players
Cincinnati Reds players
Dominican Republic expatriate baseball players in Mexico
Dominican Republic expatriate baseball players in the United States
El Paso Diablos players
Estrellas Orientales players
Kansas City T-Bones players
Lancaster JetHawks players

Louisville Bats players
Major League Baseball players from the Dominican Republic
Major League Baseball second basemen
Mexican League baseball third basemen
New Jersey Jackals players
New Orleans Zephyrs players
People from La Romana, Dominican Republic
Piratas de Campeche players
Rieleros de Aguascalientes players
Scottsdale Scorpions players
Tennessee Smokies players
Toros de Tijuana players
Toros del Este players
Tucson Sidewinders players
Yakima Bears players